Westland Mall is a shopping mall in Hialeah, Florida, United States. The anchor stores are Macy's and JCPenney. 

The mall has over 100 stores.
Westland Mall has several restaurants,  Fuddruckers, Chili's, Outback Steakhouse, IHOP and a food court with McDonald's, Subway, Charlys Grill Subs and more. The mall experiences about 10 to 12 thousand people daily from the Miami metropolitan area.

The mall, then named "Westland Mall" opened in the summer of 1971, after the mall was built to the east of the then standalone Burdine's Department Store.  At that time its anchors were Sears, Burdine's and JCPenney.  Its restaurants included a medium-sized cafeteria and a Farrell's Ice Cream parlor.

In 2015, Sears Holdings spun off 235 of its properties, including the Sears at Westland Mall, into Seritage Growth Properties. Sears downsized the first level for Forever 21 and Xfinity, and a portion of the former auto center is expected to become Panera Bread.

On November 7, 2019, it was announced that Sears would be closing this location a part of a plan to close 96 stores nationwide. The store closed in February 2020.

Westfield acquisition
In November 2007, the mall became "Westfield Westland", after The Mills sold it off to Westfield Group. The name reverted when it was sold in 2012 to Starwood Capital Group.

References

External links 

Westland Mall Official Website

Shopping malls in Miami-Dade County, Florida
Shopping malls established in 1971
Hialeah, Florida